The tulum-zurna is a Turkish and Azerbaijani bagpipe. The instrument is found on the eastern Black Sea coast of Turkey, particularly around Artvin.

References

See also
 Tulum, the common form of Turkish bagpipe

Azerbaijani musical instruments
Bagpipes
Turkish folk music instruments